A list of American feature films released in 1933. 
Cavalcade won Best Picture at the Academy Awards.

A-B

C-D

E-F

G-H

I-J

K-L

M-N

O-P

R-S

T-U

V-Z

Documentaries

Shorts

See also
 1933 in the United States

References

External links

1933 films at the Internet Movie Database

1933
Films
Lists of 1933 films by country or language